Neil John Codling (born 5 December 1973) is an English musician and songwriter, best known as the keyboardist, rhythm guitarist, backing vocalist and co-songwriter for the alternative rock band Suede.

Early life
Neil Codling was raised in Stratford-upon-Avon, Warwickshire and studied English and Drama at the University of Hull.

He and the drummer of Suede, Simon Gilbert, are cousins.

Suede
In the autumn of 1995, Codling joined the band as a keyboardist and backing vocalist whilst recording their third album, Coming Up.

His first appearance for Suede took place in Hanover Grand, on a secret fanclub gig on 27 January 1996, while his first public performance with Suede was in September 1996.

For their 1999 album Head Music, his role became considerably larger within the band, co-writing many of the album's songs. Aside from singer Brett Anderson, Codling was the only member of Suede to receive sole writing credit on several of the group's songs, which included "Elephant Man", "Digging a Hole", "Waterloo" and "Weight of the World", and sang lead on the latter three songs, all B-sides. Codling also played some rhythm guitar during live shows while he was in the group.  Together with Richard Oakes, Codling gave Suede's style a touch of pop and electricity, giving birth to two No. 1 albums in the UK: Coming Up and Head Music.

On 23 March 2001, it was announced that Codling had quit Suede, due to his chronic fatigue syndrome. In December 2004 he played a show featuring his musical project Barry O'Neil, which is a duo comprising him and Harriet Cawley.

Subsequently, Codling played keyboards on tour with the pop singer Natalie Imbruglia in 2005. In April 2007, it was announced that Codling would be playing keyboards for two Anderson solo concerts in Germany—the first time the pair would be re-united since he left Suede. In 2009, Codling joined Penguin Cafe and continues to play with the orchestra in the present day.

Codling joined his former bandmates for three UK Suede concerts in 2010, and the reunited band continued playing occasional gigs around the world throughout 2010 and 2011.

In 2013, Suede released Bloodsports, their first album in 10 years. Codling is credited with part-writing eight of its ten songs.

The Suede album Night Thoughts was released on 22 January 2016. Codling has eight writing credits of its twelve songs. He co-produced the album with Ed Buller.

A new Suede album The Blue Hour was released on 21 September 2018. Codling is co-credited with writing 9 songs in the album, as well as co-producing the album with Alan Moulder.

References

External links

1973 births
Living people
People with chronic fatigue syndrome
English keyboardists
English songwriters
English male singers
People from Stratford-upon-Avon
Suede (band) members
People educated at King Edward VI School, Stratford-upon-Avon
Alumni of the University of Hull
Alternative rock keyboardists
Britpop musicians
21st-century English singers
21st-century British male singers
Penguin Cafe members
British male songwriters